Kostner was a station on the Chicago Transit Authority's Niles Center branch, now known as the Yellow Line. The station was located at Kostner Avenue and Mulford Street in Skokie, Illinois. Kostner was situated east of Oakton and west of Crawford-East Prairie. Kostner opened on March 28, 1925, and closed on March 27, 1948, upon the closing of the Niles Center branch. The station was originally known as Schreiber Road.

References

Defunct Chicago "L" stations
Railway stations in the United States opened in 1925
Railway stations closed in 1948
1925 establishments in Illinois
1948 disestablishments in Illinois
Skokie, Illinois